Mohamed Latheef (died 3 july 2022) was a Maldives politician, a former parliamentarian and a campaigner for human rights. He is a co-founder of the MDP (Maldivian Democratic Party), a political party. He was self-exiled in Sri Lanka for a number of years.  

Laheef was educated in Sri Lanka, first at Trinity College, Kandy and then at the Royal College, Colombo. 

Latheef has alleged that his father and close relatives were killed while in prison during the regime of the former Maldivian President Ibrahim Nasir. Latheef,  who was himself a member of parliament and once a close associate of President Gayoom, was held in solitary confinement for three months without any charges being brought against him. He is the father of Jennifer Latheef, a 32-year-old journalist who was sentenced to 10 years in  prison for her alleged involvement in the civil unrest of 2003

Latheef is currently the Human Rights Ambassador of the Maldives.

External links
MDP English-language website
Maldivian vows to fight injustice

Members of the People's Majlis
Year of birth missing (living people)
Living people
Alumni of Royal College, Colombo
Maldivian Democratic Party politicians
Alumni of Trinity College, Kandy